Tarazan may refer to:

Tarazan-e Olya
Tarazan-e Sofla